The 2015 Audi Sport TT Cup season was the inaugural season of the Audi Sport TT Cup, a one-make sports car racing series organised by Audi. It began on 2 May at Hockenheim and finished on 18 October at the same venue after six double-header meetings, all of which were support events for the Deutsche Tourenwagen Masters.

Poland's Jan Kisiel won the title by 25 points ahead of Danish driver Nicolaj Møller Madsen, while Dennis Marschall of Germany completed the championship top-3, a further 19.5 points in arrears of Møller Madsen. After trailing Marschall by twenty points after the first event at Hockenheim, Kisiel then achieved a run of eight successive podium finishes, with five victories in six races – including four wins in consecutive races at Oschersleben and the Nürburgring – moving him into the championship lead. A fifth-place in the first race at the Hockenheim finale sealed the championship. Møller Madsen – who started the season with five consecutive podium finishes including a win at the Norisring – and Marschall, who won a race at the season-opening event, were split by half a point going into the final weekend, but two podium finishes for Møller Madsen moved him clear.

Outside the top three drivers, Finnish driver Joonas Lappalainen finished in fourth place after achieving a pair of class wins behind guest drivers René Rast and Marco Bonanomi in the Hockenheim finale. Three other drivers won races during the season; Shaun Thong won at the Norisring, but that was his only podium finish of the 2015 season. Belgium's Alexis van de Poele – son of 1987 DTM champion Eric van de Poele – was declared winner of the rain-shortened race at the Red Bull Ring, while Austria's Marc Coleselli won the opening race of the season, but did not contest any further meetings during the season.

Drivers

Race calendar and results

Championship standings
Scoring system
Points were awarded to the top eighteen classified finishers as follows:

Drivers' championship

The second race at the Red Bull Ring was red-flagged after four laps, due to a multi-car incident involving Christoph Hofbauer, Levin Amweg, Loris Hezemans, Kaan Önder, Emil Lindholm and Anton Marklund. The first three laps of the race had been completed behind the safety car, due to a heavy downpour. As less than 50% of the scheduled race distance had been covered, half points were awarded.

References

External links
 

Audi Sport TT Cup seasons
Audi Sport TT Cup